The Gustav Rohrich Sod House was a sod house located in Bellwood, Nebraska, United States.

References 
 HABS/HAER entry, Library of Congress
 Rootsweb article

Austrian-American history
Buildings and structures in Butler County, Nebraska
Houses in Nebraska
Sod houses
Houses completed in 1883